The 1968 California Angels season involved the Angels finishing 8th in the American League with a record of 67 wins and 95 losses.

Offseason
 October 9, 1967: Bill Skowron was released by the Angels.
 November 28, 1967: Elrod Hendricks was drafted from the Angels by the Baltimore Orioles in the 1967 rule 5 draft.
 November 29, 1967: Bill Kelso and Jorge Rubio were traded by the Angels to the Cincinnati Reds for Sammy Ellis.
 January 27, 1968: Paul Reuschel was drafted by the Angels in the 3rd round of the secondary phase of the 1968 Major League Baseball draft, but did not sign.
 Prior to 1968 season: Merritt Ranew was acquired from the Angels by the New York Yankees.

Regular season

Season standings

Record vs. opponents

Notable transactions
 July 20, 1968: Woodie Held was traded by the Angels to the Chicago White Sox for Wayne Causey.

Roster

Player stats

Batting

Starters by position
Note: Pos = Position; G = Games played; AB = At bats; H = Hits; Avg. = Batting average; HR = Home runs; RBI = Runs batted in

Other batters
Note: G = Games played; AB = At bats; H = Hits; Avg. = Batting average; HR = Home runs; RBI = Runs batted in

Pitching

Starting pitchers
Note: G = Games pitched; IP = Innings pitched; W = Wins; L = Losses; ERA = Earned run average; SO = Strikeouts

Other pitchers
Note: G = Games pitched; IP = Innings pitched; W = Wins; L = Losses; ERA = Earned run average; SO = Strikeouts

Relief pitchers
Note: G = Games pitched; W = Wins; L = Losses; SV = Saves; ERA = Earned run average; SO = Strikeouts

Awards and honors
1968 All-Star Game
 Jim Fregosi, starter, shortstop

Farm system

LEAGUE CHAMPIONS: El Paso, Quad Cities

Notes

References
1968 California Angels team at Baseball Reference
1968 California Angels team page at www.baseball-almanac.com

Los Angeles Angels seasons
California Angels season
Los